Khomer Mekomi (חומר מקומי) (lit. "local texts) is Hadag Nahash's third studio album, released in 2004.

The album features "Shirat HaSticker" (The Sticker Song), whose lyrics are based on bumper stickers in Israel. The lyrics were written by Israel novelist David Grossman.

It also features the first use of English on a Hadag Nahash record: Most of the opening song, Mitkhamem is in English.

Track listing
Mithamem (Hebrew: מתחמם) ("It's Heating Up")
Bereishit (Hebrew: בראשית) ("In the Beginning")
Shirat HaSticker (Hebrew: שירת הסטיקר) ("The Sticker Song")
Halifot (Hebrew: חליפות) ("Uniforms")
Johnny HaKatan (Hebrew: ג'וני הקטן) ("Little Johnny")
HaKafa HaMtzaltzelet (Hebrew: הכפה המצלצלת) ("The Ringing Slap")
HaPeh Lifto'ah (Hebrew: הפה לפתוח) ("The Mouth To Open")
Shvita (Hebrew: שביתה) ("Strike")
Muzika (Hebrew: מוסיקה) ("Music")
Yatziv (Hebrew: יציב) ("Stable")
Rak Po (Hebrew: רק פה) ("Only Here")
Melodika (Hebrew: מלודיקה) ("Melody")
Ma Na'aseh? (Hebrew: מה נעשה?) ("What Can We Do?")
Ratziti SheTida (Elohim Sheli) (Hebrew: רציתי שתדע) ("I Wanted You to Know (My God)")

See also
Israeli music

References

2004 albums
Hadag Nahash albums